The Battle of Cromdale took place at the Haughs of Cromdale on 30 April and 1 May 1690. The site is on a hillside near the village of Cromdale, then in Inverness-shire and now in the Highland council area. The battlefield has been included in the Inventory of Historic Battlefields in Scotland and protected by Historic Scotland under the Scottish Historical Environment Policy of 2009.

Background
After their defeat at the Battle of Dunkeld in 1689, the Highland clans had returned to their homes in low spirits. Sir Ewen Cameron assumed control over the army's remnant. Sir Ewen and the other Jacobite chiefs complained to King James over the precarious state of his support in Scotland and the necessity of sending them aid. James was occupied with preparations for resisting a threatened invasion of Ireland. To aid his supporters in Scotland, James sent clothing, arms, ammunition and provisions. He also directed a few officers from Ireland to Lochaber, among whom was Major-General Thomas Buchan, whom James made commander-in-chief of the Jacobite forces in Scotland.

On Buchan's arrival, a meeting of the chiefs and principal officers was held at Keppoch to formulate a plan of action. While some of the clans proposed to submit to the government, this proposition was resisted by Sir Ewen. The meeting unanimously resolved to continue the war, but not until the labours of the spring season were complete in the Highlands. The general muster of the clans was postponed. In the meantime, a detachment of 1,200 infantrymen was to be placed at Buchan's disposal to weaken the enemy's quarters along the borders of the Lowlands.

General Buchan advanced his men through Badenoch, intending to march down Speyside into the Duke of Gordon's country, where he expected to muster additional forces. Due to desertion, Buchan's force had dwindled to 800 men. Ignoring counsel from his Scottish officers not to advance past Culnakill, (the modern Coulnakyle near Nethybridge) Buchan marched down the Spey as far as Cromdale where he encamped on the last day of April.

Battle
He was met near Grantown-on-Spey at Cromdale by a larger government force under Sir Thomas Livingstone, commander of the garrison of Inverness. As Livingston approached with his men, on the opposite bank of the Spey, the Jacobite forces started to retreat. Livingston's cavalry crossed the river and intercepted the Jacobites who made a brief stand at the foot of the hill of Cromdale.  However, a thick fog came down the side of the mountain and enveloped the outnumbered Jacobites, compelling Livingston to discontinue the pursuit.  According to reports, the Highlanders had 400 men killed and taken prisoner.  Livingston's losses were reported as between none and 100 killed.

A group of around 100 men, who had separated from the main Jacobite force, crossed the Spey the following day. After being pursued by some of Livingston's men, they were overtaken and dispersed on the moor of Granish near Aviemore, where some of them were killed. They attempted to seize the castle of Lochinclan, but their attack was repelled by the proprietor and his tenants.

Aftermath
The defeat at Cromdale effectively ended the rebellion in Scotland. Nevertheless, Jacobite propagandists declared the action a victory for the Jacobite forces, and composed a popular song, The Haughs of Cromdale, to promote that viewpoint. It is listed in James Hogg's Jacobite Reliques as song number 2. The last verse reads:

The loyal Stuarts, with Montrose,
So boldly set upon their foes,
And brought them down with Highland blows
Upon the Haughs of Cromdale.
Of twenty-thousand Cromwell's men,
a thousand fled to Aberdeen,
The rest of them lie on the plain,
They're on the Haughs of Cromdale.

Of twenty-thousand of Cromwell's men,

a-thousand fled to Aberdeen,
The rest of them lie on the plain,
They're on the Haughs of Cromdale.

Strangely, the hero of the song, James Graham, 1st Marquess of Montrose, died forty years before the battle occurred and the antagonist Oliver Cromwell more than thirty years before. The tune has remained popular and is still played by pipe bands.

Notes and references

External links
The lyrics to The Haughs o' Cromdale

1690 in Scotland
Battles involving Scotland
Conflicts in 1690
Jacobite rising of 1689
History of the Scottish Highlands
Inventory of Historic Battlefields in Scotland